Radwan Al-Sheikh Hassan is a Syrian football defender who played for Syria in the 1984 Asian Cup.

References
Stats

Living people
Syrian footballers
Syrian Kurdish people
Association football defenders
1984 AFC Asian Cup players
Year of birth missing (living people)